Son of Batman is a 2014 American animated superhero film which is the 19th film of the DC Universe Animated Original Movies and the third film in the DC Animated Movie Universe. It is an adaptation of Grant Morrison and Andy Kubert's 2006 "Batman and Son" storyline. The film was released as a digital download on April 22, 2014, and was released on physical media May 6.

Plot
At the headquarters of the League of Assassins, Ra's al Ghul grooms Damian Wayne, the young son of his daughter, Talia, and Batman, to succeed him. The League is ambushed by a group of assassins led by Slade Wilson, Ra's al Ghul's initial choice for successor before Damian's birth; Ra's is defeated and fatally injured by Slade, dying before he can heal his injuries with the Lazarus Pit. After the incident, Talia takes Damian to Gotham City to meet his father and remain in his care while she and the League deal with Slade. The aggressive, highly independent Damian objects and frequently disobeys his father's orders in an attempt to seek out Slade and avenge Ra's himself. After he is accosted by Nightwing for sneaking out and brutally attacking an associate of Slade's, Batman berates Damian for his recklessness and willingness to kill. Batman then has Damian don the mantle of Robin in order to teach him discipline.

Slade, now calling himself Deathstroke, captures Talia as well as Dr. Kirk Langstrom, a scientist previously working with Ra's. Commissioner Gordon warns Batman about an abandoned stadium believed to house Deathstroke's men; after infiltrating the stadium, Batman and Damian attempt to question Langstrom, who initially refuses to leave as Deathstroke is holding his family hostage. When Damian becomes violently impatient and inadvertently alerts the enemy to their arrival, the groups is confronted by a swarm of Man-Bats, which Langstrom explains is part of Deathstroke's plan to create superhuman, flight-capable assassins. While Nightwing works with Langstrom on an antidote for the Man-Bats, Batman and Damian set off to rescue Langstrom's family. Batman deduces that Talia has been abducted and while rescuing Langstrom's family, Damian is relayed her location via a ransom video given to Langstrom's daughter.

Nightwing learns that Deathstroke is operating in an oil rig off the Scottish coast, and while Batman is distracted, Damian goes to the rig alone to rescue his mother. He finds Deathstroke and Talia in an underwater base with a swarm of Man-Bats and another Lazarus Pit, which Deathstroke intends to sell for profit. Deathstroke attempts to kill Damian, mortally wounding Talia as she shields her son from a gunshot. Batman arrives to assist and heals Talia in the Lazarus Pit, while Nightwing and Langstrom cure the Man-Bats.

After a brutal fight, Damian manages to defeat Deathstroke, but refuses to kill him because it is not what his father would do. The underwater base is destroyed when the Man-Bats, overwhelmed by sonar devices placed by Batman, break the glass elevator shaft and flood the base. Batman, Talia and Damian escape to safety, but the unconscious Deathstroke is left behind. Discussing what to do with Damian now that Deathstroke has been neutralized, Batman believes that Damian should stay with him and remain as Robin while Talia still wishes to recreate the League with Batman and Damian at her side. Talia relents and allows Damian to stay in Gotham with his father, but states her intention to return for him someday.

During the credits, the fight between Damian and Nightwing is shown.

Voice cast

Soundtrack

The soundtrack to Son of Batman was released on May 20, 2014, with music composed by Frederik Wiedmann.
Tracklist

Reception

Critical reception
IGN gave the film a rating of 7.5 out of 10, saying that "Son of Batman finds the humor amidst the more adult-oriented action elements in this latest DC animated adventure". Common Sense Media gave the film a 4 star rating out of 5, saying that "violent and noirish Batman is engaging but cynical". Conversely, Brian Lowry of Variety stated that "at times this feels like a sitcom premise — a chop-socky "Full House", or maybe, "Full Cave". Tommy Cook for Collider.com also gave the film a negative review: "Striving for the dark edge of what I guess people expect from a Batman movie while still maintaining that Saturday morning toon sheen, the film feels mass produced to appeal to all (give the adults – gore; the kids – a spunky child sidekick); however in the effort to appease everyone, SoB in fact caters to none".

Sales
The film earned $6,972,737 from domestic home video sales.

Sequels
Two sequels were released including: Batman vs. Robin in 2015 and Batman: Bad Blood in 2016.

Notes

References

External links

 

2014 films
2010s English-language films
2010s American animated films
2010s direct-to-video animated superhero films
2010s animated superhero films
2014 animated films
2014 direct-to-video films
Animated action films
Animated Batman films
Robin (character) films
DC Animated Movie Universe
Films about father–son relationships
Films about dysfunctional families
Films directed by Ethan Spaulding
Films scored by Frederik Wiedmann
Films set in London
Films set in Scotland
Films set in China
2014 science fiction action films
American action films
Animated science fiction films
Films set in 2014
Animated films about revenge